Solveig Slettahjell (born 2 April 1971 in Bærum, Norway) is a Norwegian jazz singer, known for her soulful, seductive voice.

Career 
Slettahjell had her record debut with the album Slow Motion Orchestra (2003), contains jazz standards like "All the Way" and "My Heart Belongs to Daddy". It was released after festival appearance at Nattjazz 2002. For her second album, Silver (2004), her band took the name "Slow Motion Quintet". In 2005, they released Pixiedust.

After working with a commission for Vossajazz Festiva (2009), she released the music on the acclaimed album Tarpan Seasons (2010). In 2012 she acclaimed performance at "Oslo Jazz Festival" 2012 with Gregory Porter.

Slettahjell collaborated with Tord Gustavsen and Sjur Miljeteig releasing the albums Natt I Betlehem (2008) and Arven (2013) including with Nils Økland. In 2011 she released the album Antology with Morten Qvenild and in 2015 the album Trail of Souls with Knut Reiersrud and the jazz ensemble In the Country.

Honors
2004: Spellemannprisen in the class Jazz
2005: Radka Toneff Memorial Award
2005: Kongsberg Jazz Award
2011: Gammleng-prisen in the class Jazz

Discography

As leader

With others 
1998: Squid – Super (Forward)
1999: Kvitretten – Everything Turns (Curling Legs)
2002: Kvitretten – Kloden er en snurrebass som snurrer oss  (Curling Legs)
2002: Sigvart Dagsland – Underlig Frihet (Kirkelig Kulturverksted), as guest vocalist on one track
2005: Jon Balke Batagraf – Statements (ECM)
2006: Friko – The Journey to Mandoola (C+C)
2014: Bugge Wesseltoft, Knut Reiersrud and In The Country – Norwegian Woods – Jazz at Berlin Philharmonic II (ACT)

References

External links 

}

Norwegian women jazz singers
Musicians from Bærum
Norwegian jazz composers
Spellemannprisen winners
ACT Music artists
1971 births
Living people
20th-century Norwegian women singers
20th-century Norwegian singers
21st-century Norwegian women singers
21st-century Norwegian singers
Trondheim Voices members
Curling Legs artists
Universal Music Group artists
Jazzland Recordings (1997) artists